The 1966 German Grand Prix was a mixed Formula One and Formula Two motor race held at the Nürburgring Nordschleife on 7 August 1966. It was race 6 of 9 in both the 1966 World Championship of Drivers and the 1966 International Cup for Formula One Manufacturers. It was the 28th German Grand Prix and the 22nd to be held at the Nordschleife. It was held over 15 laps of the 22 kilometre circuit for a race distance 342 kilometres.

The race was won by 1959 and 1960 World Champion Jack Brabham driving his Brabham BT19, his fourth win in succession. Brabham won by 43 seconds over the Cooper T81 driven by 1964 World Champion John Surtees. Surtees' Austrian teammate Jochen Rindt finished third. The first Formula Two driver to finish was French driver Jean-Pierre Beltoise in eighth driving a Matra Sports entered Matra MS5.

The race also saw the death of British driver John Taylor after a collision with Jacky Ickx.

Brabham had collected 39 points, more than double his nearest rival, BRM driver Graham Hill.

Race report 
Another wet track provided a duel between Jack Brabham and John Surtees for the whole race. It was not until the Cooper's clutch failed two laps from the end that the Australian's win was guaranteed. Jim Clark, despite qualifying on pole, made a mistake and spun into a ditch after using the wrong tyres. In a far more serious crash, the Tyrrell-entered Matra MS5 of Jacky Ickx and the privately-entered Brabham BT11 of John Taylor crashed near the bridge between Quiddelbacher and Flugplatz. Taylor was badly burned in the accident and succumbed to his injuries four weeks later.

This would be the last Formula One race on the original Nürburgring Nordschleife before the Hohenrain chicane was added to slow the cars coming into the pits.

Classification

Qualifying

Race

Note: The race was held with both Formula One and Formula Two cars competing together. Formula Two entries are denoted by a pink background.

Championship standings after the race

Drivers' Championship standings

Constructors' Championship standings

 Notes: Only the top five positions are included for both sets of standings.

References

External links

German Grand Prix
German Grand Prix
German Grand Prix